Aldana may refer to:

A family name first found in the region of Galicia, (near Santiago de Compostela) or derived from the small town of Aldana in the Basque country, Spain
 Adolfo Aldana (born 1966), Spanish retired footballer
 Andrea Aldana (born 1989), Guatemalan sports sailor
 Carlos Enrique Pena Aldana (born 1988), Guatemalan singer and songwriter
 David Aldana (born 1949), American former professional motorcycle racer
 Eduardo Fernández Aldana (born 1990), Mexican footballer
 Felipe Aldana (1922–1970), Argentine poet
 Fernando Martínez Aldana (born 1977), Mexican football manager and former player
 Fernando Schwalb López Aldana (1916–2002), Peruvian politician
 Irene Aldana (born 1988), Mexican mixed martial artist
 Jose Manuel Gomez Vazquez Aldana (born 1937), Mexican architect
 Lucia Aldana (born 1992), Colombian model
 Luis Artemio Aldana Burgos (born 1962), Mexican politician
 Luis Ricardo Aldana (born 1954), Mexican politician
 Maria Aldana Cetra (born 1980), Argentine racing cyclist
 Melissa Aldana (born 1988), Chilean tenor saxophone player
 Raúl Aldana (born 1966), Mexican voice actor
 Roberto Moreira Aldana (born 1987), Paraguayan footballer
 Thelma Aldana (born 1955), Guatemalan judge
 Víctor Aldana (born 1981), Spanish footballer
Aldana, a town and municipality in the Nariño Department, Colombia

See also
Auldana

Spanish-language surnames
Galician-language surnames
Basque-language surnames